Cândea is a Romanian surname. Notable people with the surname include:

Constantin Cândea (1887–1971), Romanian chemist
Maria Cândea (1889–1974), Romanian teacher and school director
Romulus Cândea (1886–1973), Austro-Hungarian born Romanian historian

Romanian-language surnames